Release notes are documents that are distributed with software products or hardware products, sometimes when the product is still in the development or test state (e.g., a beta release). For products that have already been in use by clients, the release note is delivered to the customer when an update is released. Another abbreviation for Release notes is Changelog or Release logs or Software changes or Revision history Updates or README file. However, in some cases, the release notes and changelog are published separately. This split is for clarity and differentiation of feature-highlights from bugs, change requests (CRs) or improvements on the other side.

Purpose
Release notes are documents that are shared with end users, customers and clients of an organization. The definition of the terms 'End Users', 'Clients' and 'Customers' are very relative in nature and might have various interpretations based on the specific context. For instance, the Quality Assurance group within a software development organization can be interpreted as an internal customer.

Content 
Release notes detail the corrections, changes or enhancements (functional or non-functional) made to the service or product the company provides.

They might also be provided as an artifact accompanying the deliverables for System Testing and System Integration Testing and other managed environments especially with reference to an information technology organization.

Release notes can also contain test results and information about the test procedure. This kind of information gives readers of the release note more confidence in the fix/change done; this information also enables implementer of the change to conduct rudimentary acceptance tests.

They differ from End-user license agreement, since they do not (should not) contain any legal terms of the software product or service. The focus should be on the software release itself, not for example legal conditions.

Release notes can also be interpreted as describing how to install or build the software, instead of highlighting new features or resolved bugs. Another term often used in this context is System Requirements, meaning the required hardware and software for installing or building the software.

Format style
There is no standard format for release notes that is followed throughout different organizations. Organizations normally adopt their own formatting styles based on the requirement and type of the information to be circulated. The content of release notes also vary according to the release type. For products that are at testing stage and that are newly released, the content is usually more descriptive compared to release notes for bug fixes and feature enhancements, which are usually brief.

Release notes may include the following sections:
 Header – Document name (i.e. release notes), product name, release number, release date, note date, note version, etc.
 Overview - A brief overview of the product and changes, in the absence of other formal documentation.
 Purpose - A brief overview of the purpose of the release note with a listing of what is new in this release, including bug fixes and new features.
 Issue summary - A short description of the bug or the enhancement in the release.
 Steps to reproduce - The steps that were followed when the bug was encountered.
 Resolution - A short description of the modification/enhancement that was made to fix the bug.
 End-user impact - What different actions are needed by the end-users of the application.  This should include whether other functionality is impacted by these changes.
 Support impacts - Changes required in the daily process of administering the software.
 Notes - Notes about software or hardware installation, upgrades and product documentation (including documentation updates)
 Disclaimers - Company and standard product related messages. e.g.; freeware, anti-piracy, duplication etc.. See also disclaimer.
 Contact - Support contact information.

A release note is usually a terse summary of recent changes, enhancements and bug fixes in a particular software release. It is not a substitute for user guides. Release notes are frequently written in the present tense and provide information that is clear, correct, and complete.

A proposal for an open-specification exists and is called Release Notes Schema Specification.

Prominent examples (mainly software) 
The following list is a selection of major software from different branches, such as software games, operating systems, automotive, CAD design, etc.
 Apache Maven Project Release Notes
Apple iOS 14 Updates
Apple macOS Release Notes
Apple Xcode Release Notes
FreeBSD Releases
FXhome's Hitfilm Express
GNOME Release Notes
Gitlab Releases
i.MX Linux® Release Notes (PDF by NXP Semiconductors)
Atlassian Jira Software release notes
Linux (Ubuntu)
Linux Kernel 5.x
Microsoft Visual Studio Release Notes
 Minecraft Release Changelogs
Tesla Software Updates
Unity3d 2020.1.0
Wikipedia MediaWiki software
Windows 10 (see also Windows Release Health)
Xilinx Release Notes (e.g. Vivado Design Suite)

See also

Further reading 

 Laura Moreno et al. ARENA: An Approach for the Automated Generation of Release Notes, IEEE Transactions on Software Engineering (Volume: 43, Issue: 2, Feb. 1 2017)
 Casey Newton. I drank beer and wrote release notes with the Medium release notes team, The Verge (2016-02-10)
GNU coding standards - 6.8 Change Logs

References

External links 
 How to write release notes
 How should release notes be written? (Stackoverflow)
 The Strange Art of Writing App Release Notes
Release Notes Hub (also https://www.release-notes.com) open-source on GitHub
 Release Notes Schema Specification

Technical communication
Software
Configuration management
Change management